Kudzai Sevenzo is a Zimbabwean actress and singer.

Career background 

Kudzai's acting and singing career was launched by Africa's Mogul Media Giant MNET, on the television talent show called Project Fame, where she competed against 16 contestants from all across Africa. Kudzai Sevenzo was selected to be the sole representative of Zimbabwe and became one of 3 contestants who got the opportunity to showcase their songwriting talent.

Kudzai made it to the penultimate round in Project Fame. Following this, she released her debut album On A Day Like This, produced by producer and friend Andrew Baird.

She released her second album Child of Africa, also produced by Andrew Baird.

TV 

Kudzai's star continued to rise as she was selected to anchor for a magazine show on MNET called Studio 53, which saw her travelling Africa and exploring its cuisine, arts and culture. The show allowed her to explore the diversity of Africa, and get to interview Africa's first female president, Ellen Johnson Sirleaf.

Recommendations
United States of America actor and artist, Nyambi Nyambi Jnr, commended Kudzai Sevenzo as a vastly talented actress he has ever seen from Zimbabwe. Nyambi Nyambi said to the Zimbabwe Mail. “Kudzai has got the qualities such that she does not even put a lot of effort when executing her roles and that alone gives her the credibility of being the best from Zimbabwe.”.

References

 

Zimbabwean jazz musicians
Alumni of Chisipite Senior School
Living people
Year of birth missing (living people)